Wilhelm Ehmer (August 1, 1896 – June 16, 1976) was a German poet. He was born in Hong Kong and died in Lüdenscheid. In 1936 he won a silver medal in the art competitions of the Olympic Games for his Um den Gipfel der Welt (Around the Peak of the World).

References

External links
 profile

1896 births
1976 deaths
German expatriates in British Hong Kong
People from Lüdenscheid
Olympic silver medalists in art competitions
German male poets
20th-century German poets
Medalists at the 1936 Summer Olympics
20th-century German male writers
Commanders Crosses of the Order of Merit of the Federal Republic of Germany
Olympic competitors in art competitions